Iisalmi railway station is located in Iisalmi, Finland. The station is operated by VR.

In December 2006 the electrification of the railway between Iisalmi and Oulu was completed.

External links
 
 VR – Iisalmi station

Buildings of Iisalmi
Railway stations in North Savo
Railway stations opened in 1902